Paul Holmes à Court (born Paul William Holmes à Court in 1972) is an Australian businessman and wine maker. He is the son of Australia's first billionaire Robert Holmes à Court and CEO of Vasse Felix.

Early life
Holmes à Court was born in 1972, the son of South African-born Australian businessman Robert Holmes à Court (who became Australia's first billionaire), and businesswoman (and chairperson of Heytesbury Pty Ltd), Janet Holmes à Court.

Career
In 2000, Holmes à Court took over the management of Heytesbury from his mother Janet after his father Robert passed away in 1990. In 2008 Holmes à Court bought out his siblings and took over sole ownership of the company.

Personal life
Holmes à Court is the Northern Territory's largest individual pastoral landowner, owning over 16,700 square kilometers. 

Holmes à Court has 5 children.

References

1967 births
Australian businesspeople
Australian winemakers
Australian pastoralists
Living people